The men's 10,000 metres at the 1974 European Athletics Championships was held in Rome, Italy, at Stadio Olimpico on 2 September 1974.

Medalists

Results

Final
2 September

Participation
According to an unofficial count, 31 athletes from 17 countries participated in the event.

 (3)
 (3)
 (2)
 (2)
 (1)
 (1)
 (2)
 (1)
 (3)
 (3)
 (1)
 (1)
 (2)
 (1)
 (3)
 (1)
 (1)

References

10000 metres
10,000 metres at the European Athletics Championships